Aqueducts on the Canal du Midi allow the canal to intersect and cross over natural streams.  There are two exceptions, the first is the Herbettes Aqueduct where it crosses a four-lane highway in Toulouse.  Another exception is where it intersections with the Libron river and the crossing is accomplished via the Ouvrages du Libron.

Aqueducts on the Canal du Midi will be named either as an aqueduct or a canal bridge.  In most cases, the aqueduct is a more simple structure, just allowing the stream to pass under the canal.  The pont-canal, on the other hand, is a much larger bridge style structure with perhaps more than one arch.

References
 Voies Navigables Canaux du Midi. Editions De L'Ecluse. 2008. .
 Midi Camargue Waterways Guide 7. Editions Du Breil. .

Notes
 Distance in km from the beginning of the canal in Toulouse.